Marcin Prokop (born 14 July 1977) is a Polish journalist, television and radio personality. On TVN Turbo he was the presenter of Automaniak.

References

1977 births
Living people
Polish radio journalists
Polish television presenters
Polish radio presenters
Polish television journalists